Maria J. Stephan is an American political scientist. She is the former Director of the program on nonviolent action at the United States Institute of Peace. She studies authoritarianism, protest, and the effectiveness of violent and nonviolent types of civil resistance.

Education and early work
Stephan is from Vermont, and earned a Bachelor of Arts degree at Boston College. She then attended the Fletcher School of Law and Diplomacy, where she earned a Master of Arts degree in Law and Diplomacy and Doctor of Philosophy. During her graduate education she was the recipient of a Harry S. Truman Scholarship, which is a graduate fellowship dedicated to public service. She was also a J. William Fulbright Scholar.

Career
Before working with the United States Institute of Peace, Stephan worked at the United States Department of State where she was the lead foreign affairs officer for the Bureau of Conflict and Stabilization Operations, and at NATO headquarters.

Together with Erica Chenoweth, Stephan wrote the 2010 book Why Civil Resistance Works: The Strategic Logic of Nonviolent Conflict. The book studies the success rates of civil resistance efforts from 1900 to 2006, focusing on the major violent and nonviolent efforts to bring about regime change during that time. By comparing the success rates of 323 violent and nonviolent campaigns, Stephan and Chenoweth demonstrate that only 26% of violent revolutions were successful, whereas 53% of nonviolent campaigns were successful. Of the 25 largest movements they studied, 20 were nonviolent, and they found that nonviolent movements attracted four times as many participants on average than violent movements. They also demonstrated that nonviolent movements tended to precede the development of more democratic regimes than violent movements.

The authors coined a rule about the level of participation necessary for a movement to succeed, called the "3.5% rule": nearly every movement with active participation from at least 3.5% of the population succeeded. All of the campaigns that achieved that threshold were nonviolent.

Why Civil Resistance Works won the 2012 Woodrow Wilson Foundation Prize from the American Political Science Association, which is awarded each year for "the best book on government, politics, or international affairs". For Why Civil Resistance Works, Stephan and her coauthor Erica Chenoweth won the 2013 Grawemeyer Award for Ideas Improving World Order. In 2015 Stephan was the recipient of the inaugural Henry J. Leir Human Security Award, which is awarded by Institute for Human Security at Fletcher University for "outstanding Fletcher alumni who have made significant contributions to the scholarship and/or practice of human security".

Stephan's work has been covered extensively in media outlets like The Globe and Mail, Vice, NPR, and Quartz.

See also 
 Civilian-based defense

References

American women social scientists
American women political scientists
American political scientists
21st-century American women scientists
21st-century American women writers
Living people
Date of birth missing (living people)
Boston College alumni
The Fletcher School at Tufts University alumni
Year of birth missing (living people)